Stik n Move are an Australian hip hop group. The group is made up of brothers in law Nathan "TooDeadly" Carter and Michael "Wizz" Weir. They are joined by Koolism's DJ Danielsan for their live shows.

The group was named Most Promising New Talent in Music at the Deadly Awards 2013.

Members
 Nathan "TooDeadly" Carter
 Michael "Wizz" Weir

References

New South Wales musical groups
Indigenous Australian musical groups
Australian hip hop groups